The 1987 NCAA men's volleyball tournament was the 18th annual tournament to determine the national champion of NCAA men's collegiate volleyball. The tournament was played at Pauley Pavilion in Los Angeles, California during May 1987.

UCLA defeated rival USC in the final match, 3–0 (15–11, 15–2, 16–14), to win their 12th national title. The Bruins (38–3) were coached by Al Scates.

UCLA's Ozzie Volstad was named the tournament's Most Outstanding Player. Volstad, along with six other players, also comprised the All-tournament team.

Qualification
Until the creation of the NCAA Men's Division III Volleyball Championship in 2012, there was only a single national championship for men's volleyball. As such, all NCAA men's volleyball programs, whether from Division I, Division II, or Division III, were eligible. A total of 4 teams were invited to contest this championship.

Tournament bracket 
Site: Pauley Pavilion, Los Angeles, California

All tournament team 
Ozzie Volstad, UCLA (Most outstanding player)
Arne Lamberg, UCLA
Jeff Williams, UCLA
Chris Chase, Penn State
Javier Gaspar, Penn State
Adam Johnson, USC
Dave Yoder, USC

See also 
 NCAA Men's National Collegiate Volleyball Championship
 NCAA Division I Women's Volleyball Championship

References

1987
NCAA Men's Volleyball Championship
NCAA Men's Volleyball Championship
1987 in sports in California
Volleyball in California